Kent Daniel Mobæck (born 22 May 1980) is a Swedish footballer who last played for IF Elfsborg in the Allsvenskan. His debut in the Swedish national team came on a tour in South America in January 2007.

He usually plays as a right back or right midfielder. However, he can play all across the midfield, and even striker.

References

External links

 

1980 births
Living people
People from Kalmar
Swedish footballers
Association football defenders
Sweden international footballers
Allsvenskan players
Kalmar FF players
IF Elfsborg players
Sportspeople from Kalmar County